The prime minister of Bhutan (Lyonchhen) is the head of government of Bhutan. The prime minister is nominated by the party that wins the most seats in the National Assembly (Gyelyong Tshogdu) and heads the executive cabinet, called the Council of Ministers (Lhengye Zhungtshog).

On 9 April 2008, Jigme Thinley became the first ever elected prime minister; he took office following the country's first democratic election.

The current prime minister is Lotay Tshering, since 7 November 2018; he is the country's 3rd democratically elected prime minister.

Prime ministers of the Kingdom of Bhutan

Chief ministers (Gongzim)

Prime ministers (Lyonchen)

Notes

References

See also
 List of rulers of Bhutan

External links
 Official Website of the Government of Bhutan

Bhutan
 
Prime ministers
1907 establishments in Bhutan
1952 establishments in Bhutan
Prime ministers
Prime ministers